Report from the Interior is an autobiographical work by Paul Auster published in 2013. It is a companion volume to Auster's Winter Journal (2012), and so was the second book of memoirs Auster published in back-to-back years.

Contents
Auster arranges the book into the following sections:

Report from the Interior
Two Blows to the Head
Time Capsule
Album (Photos)

References

External links

2013 non-fiction books
Books by Paul Auster
Henry Holt and Company books
Faber and Faber books